Car-free can refer to several things:

Pedestrian zones
Car-free movement
carfree city - a population center that relies primarily on public transport, walking, or cycling for transport within the urban area.

See also

Carree (name)